Anders Beer may refer to:
 Anders Beer (shipowner) (1801–1863), Norwegian shipowner and tanner
 Anders Beer (engineer) (1875–1957), Norwegian businessman

See also
 Anders Beer Wilse (1865–1949), Norwegian photographer